Mubandan (also Romanized as Mūbandān) is a village in Divshal Rural District, in the Central District of Langarud County, Gilan Province, Iran. At the 2006 census, its population was 426 people, in 128 families.

References 

Populated places in Langarud County